York Cliffs is a village in the town of York in York County, Maine, United States.  It lies east of the village of Cape Neddick and north of York Beach.

References

York, Maine
Villages in York County, Maine
Populated coastal places in Maine